Hotel is a 2004 Austrian drama film directed by Jessica Hausner. It was screened in the Un Certain Regard section at the 2004 Cannes Film Festival.

Plot summary

Cast
 Franziska Weisz as Irene
 Birgit Minichmayr as Petra
 Marlene Streeruwitz as Mrs. Maschek
 Rosa Waissnix as Mrs. Liebig
 Christopher Schärf as Erik
 Peter Strauß as Mr. Kross
 Regina Fritsch as Mrs. Karin
 Alfred Worel as Mr. Liebig

References

External links
 
 
 

2004 films
2000s German-language films
2004 drama films
Films directed by Jessica Hausner
Austrian drama films
Films set in hotels